Club Deportivo Ñublense is a professional football team based in Chillán, Ñuble Region, Chile. The club was formed in 1916 under the name of Liceo Fútbol Club. They compete in Chile's Primera División league.

History

Amateur era
Ñublense was formed in 1916 by a group of teenagers (led by Chillán teacher Manuel Lara Gutiérrez) who founded a sports club as a haven for sports activities in the city. On 20 August of that year, in the boys' high school the club was called the Liceo Fútbol Club. Other sports sponsored included basketball and boxing. The football team played for many years in local leagues, where they were champions for 11 consecutive years (1938–49). Noted players included Eduardo Sanhueza Martín, Candelario Sepúlveda, Tomás Figueroa Bravo, Carlos González Utreras and  Humberto Fagnilli Fuentes (who renamed the club Liceo Ñublense).

On 1942, with Lautaro Vásquez Landa as coach, the team was renamed Club de Deportes Ñublense. It continued in local leagues until 1957, when team president Moisés Noriega Alarcón moved the team to a regional league where it played teams such as Lord Cochrane de Concepción, Universitario, Gente de Mar, Galvarino and Arturo Fernández Vial.

Professional era
In 1959, under coach Mario Avedaño, Ñublense for play in the professionalism, and Ñublense entered the Chilean professional league. Under Argentine coach Martín Garcia many young players joined the club, including Universidad de Chile goalkeeper Luis Venzano Justiniano (the first professional football player on the team).

In 1961 (under coach Renato Sánchez Solar) Ñublense signed José Borello, who played for Boca Juniors and the Argentine national team. The team finished fourth with such players as Carlos Abel Jarpa Vallejos, Vicente Cox Vial and Luis Fischer, who added stability to the club. For the first two years Ñublense, played in the only paved football field in Chillán (the stadium of Seminario School) whilst the grass was sown and the stands and dressing rooms built.

In 1976 the team had one its best seasons (with Pedro Guzmán Alvarez as president and Isaac Carrasco as coach), winning the Primera B (Second Division) and promotion to the Primera División Chilena for 1977. Its second year in the Primera División, Ñublense had its most important coach in team history (Nelson Oyarzún Arenas, nicknamed "Consommé" because he required his players to drink consommé after games), who won the fans' respect. On 10 September 1978, Nelson Oyarzún died of cancer; that afternoon, Ñublense won 2–1 over Colo-Colo in a memorable game. Shortly afterwards, the Estadio Municipal de Chillán was renamed Estadio Municipal de Chillán Nelson Oyarzún in the coach's honor.

Decline
In 1979, with Hernan Godoy as the coach, Ñublense was relegated to Primera B. However, a year later the club was again promoted to Primera División. The joy was short-lived, though; the team was again relegated to segunda and then to Tercera División for three years. Amidst financial problems, the team was renamed Ñuble Unido.

In 1985, under Esaú Bravo, the undefeated team won the Tercera División title and promotion to Primera B. Héctor Canahuete restructured the team's debt and recovered the name Ñublense. In 1991, during a lockout, the team was again relegated to Tercera División.

In 1992, Esaú Bravo returned to the Ñublense bench for its promotion to Primera B after defeating San Luis de Quillota 4–2 in the Primera B promotion play-offs. Ñublense performed well in Copa Chile 1995, eliminating Colo-Colo in the quarter-finals but losing to Universidad Católica in the semi-finals.

In 2000, the team was relegated to Tercera; in 2001 it was nearly relegated to the Cuarta División Chilena.  With 30 seconds remaining in a game against General Velásquez, Edgardo Medina scored to keep the team in Tercera División.

Since 2000

Former sportscaster Sergio Zarzar acquired the club in 2004; that year, it was promoted to the Primera B after winning the Tercera División title under coach Luis Marcoleta.

Ñublense was runner-up in the Primera B in 2006 and returned to the Primera División Chilena in 2007, finishing ninth. In summer 2008, Fernando Díaz became coach after Marcoleta's departure for Curicó Unido.

Under Díaz in the Torneo de Apertura, Ñublense had their most successful season. The team finished first in the regular season with 41 points, five points clear of Universidad Católica and O'Higgins. Ñublense was eliminated in the play-off semi-finals by Colo-Colo, but its first-place finish in the first round qualified the team for the Copa Sudamericana 2008 for the first time. In this tournament, however, Ñublense was quickly eliminated by Peruvian club Sport Áncash by an aggregate score of 4–1.

Since 2008, the team has fared less well. In the Primera División Chilena 2009 season Ñublense finished 13th in the annual table with 39 points (nearly making the promotion play-offs), and achieved an identical result in 2010.

Stadium

Estadio Municipal de Chillán Nelson Oyarzún Arenas, home to the Ñublense club, is named after Nelson Oyarzún Arenas, a Ñublense coach. It was opened in 1961 and has a capacity of 12,000. In 2007, the stadium was selected as a venue for the 2008 FIFA U-20 Women's World Cup. To comply with FIFA standards it was demolished and rebuilt (with the direction the pitch is facing altered), its capacity was decreased from 17,500 to 12,000 and a roof covering all seats was built. The renovation of the stadium cost 12 billion pesos ($26 million). The stadium was re-dedicated on 2 November 2008, with former Chilean president Michelle Bachelet in attendance. On 27 February 2010, during the 2010 Chile earthquake, much damage occurred to the stadium; nearly the entire Pacific gallery collapsed.

Support and rivalries
In 2007, Ñublense had the fourth-highest average attendance in the Torneo de Apertura de Chile 2007 behind the "three giants of Chile": Universidad de Chile, Universidad Católica and Colo-Colo. Ñublense's fans are known as "red devils" or "reds" (the same color as Premier League team Manchester United) or "La Longaniza Mécanica" ("The Clockwork Longaniza"). These nicknames arose after the successful 2008 season when Ñublense first qualified for the Torneo de Apertura de Chile 2008 play-offs and the Copa Sudamericana 2008. That season, the team was frequently compared with Manchester United. Ñublense's record attendance was on 21 May 2008, when 18,487 fans attended the second leg of the semi-finals of the Torneo de Apertura de 2008 against Colo-Colo at the Estadio Municipal de Concepción. Curicó Unido, Deportes Concepción, Universidad de Concepción and Universidad Católica are unofficial rivals of the team.

Honours
Segunda División: 1976, 2020
Copa Apertura Segunda División: 1971
Tercera División: 1986, 1992, 2004

South American cups history

Club records
Record league victory: 5–0 vs. Deportes Antofagasta in 1977 Primera División (April 24, 1977)
Record league defeat: 1–8 vs. Naval in 1981 Primera División (Jan 2, 1982)
Record Copa Chile victory — 6–1 vs. Iberia Bío-Bío (1977)
Record attendance: 18,487 vs. Colo-Colo (May 21, 2008) 2008-A (at Municipal de Concepción)
Most league goals scored (overall): 44 Manuel Villalobos (2005–07)
Most goals scored (Primera División matches): 26 Luis Flores (2007-2010)
Primera División best position: 1st, regular season (2008-A)
Copa Chile best season: Semi-finalists (1995)

Players

Current squad

2021 Winter Transfers

In

Out

Managers
 Luis Marcoleta (2004–07)
 Fernando Díaz (Jan 1, 2008 – Aug 10, 2009)
 Oscar del Solar (Jan 1, 2010 – Aug 1, 2010)
 Ricardo Toro (Aug 1, 2010 – Oct 26, 2010)
 Luis Marcoleta (Oct 1, 2010 – April 30, 2011)
 Jorge Garcés (May 1, 2011 – Sept 15, 2011)
 Carlos Rojas (Dec 14, 2011–13)
 Pablo Abraham (Aug 31, 2013–14)
 Ivo Basay (2014–15)
 Fernando Díaz (2015–16)
 Pablo Abraham (2016–17)
 Rubén Espinoza (2017) (Interim)
 Emiliano Astorga (2017–)

References

External links
Fans Website 

 
Football clubs in Chile
Association football clubs established in 1916
Sport in Biobío Region
1916 establishments in Chile